Ernest Leopoldovich Radlov or Ernst Radlow (1854—1928) was a Russian neo-Kantian philosopher and historian of philosophy of German origin. Co-founder of the St. Petersburg Philosophical Society, director of the Public Library in Petrograd (1918—1924).

He was also a friend and editor of Vladimir Solovyov.

Radlov introduced Thomas Masaryk to Russian philosophy in conversations over the summer of 1882.

Works
 Etika Aristotelia [Aristotle's Ethics], 1884
 “Ob istolkovanii” Aristotelia [On the interpretation of Aristotle], 1891
 (ed.) Pisʹma [Letters] of Vladimir Solovyov, 3 vols, 1908.
 Solov’eva o svobode voli [Solovyov on free will], 1911
 Ocherk istorii russkoǐ filosofii [Essay on the history of Russian philosophy], 1912. [Translated into German by Margarete Woltner as Russische Philosophie (1925) and into Italian by Ettore Lo Gatto as Storia della filosofia russa (1925).]
 Filosofskiy slovar’ [Dictionary of philosophy], 1913

References

1854 births
1928 deaths
Russian philosophers
Privy Councillor (Russian Empire)
Journal of the Ministry of Education editors